Pierre-Armand Malitourne (19 July 1796 – 19 April 1866) was a 19th-century French journalist, literary critic and writer.

Biography 
After he studied at the college of Alençon, he moved to Paris in 1816. In 1819, he obtained a prize from the Académie française for his book Éloge de Lesage and made his debut at La Quotidienne where he published articles on a regular basis. Under the Ministry Martignac, he participated to Le Messager des Chambres then, after the July Revolution of 1830, became editor at La Charte de 1830.

He was made chevalier of the Légion d'honneur (1828)

He is buried at Père Lachaise Cemetery.

Works 
1817: Traité du mélodrame, with Jean-Joseph Ader and Abel Hugo 
1819: Éloge de Lesage
1820: Des résolutions militaires et de la charte
1820: De l'Éloquence de la tribune et du barreau
1827: Mémoires d'une contemporaine (under the pseudonym Madame Ida Saint-Elme) (8 vol. 1827)
1827: A mes amis Picard et Mazères, comedy
1856: Le Presbytère, with Nicolas Martin

In addition, he participated to the Dictionnaire de la conversation (1826). He also published an edition of œuvres choisies by Balzac (2 vol.1822) and Œuvres by Rivarol (1852).

Bibliography 
 Obituary in the Journal des Débats, 29 April 1866
 Gustave Vapereau, Dictionnaire Universel des contemporains, 1870, (p. 1045) 
 Pierre Larousse, Grand dictionnaire universel du XIXe siècle, (p. 1019)
 Paul Bauer, 2 siècles d'histoire au Père Lachaise, 2006, (p. 520)

References 

 

19th-century French journalists
French male journalists
French literary critics
1796 births
People from Orne
1866 deaths
Burials at Père Lachaise Cemetery
19th-century French male writers